Mouse droppings can mean:
faeces left by a mouse (the animal), unhygienic and often a sign of infestation by mice
computer users' jargon for unwanted marks left on a computer screen by software by passage of the mouse (computing).